Transporte Aéreo Rioplatense SACL was an Argentine cargo airline that operated in the 1970s and 1980s.

History

The airline was set up in December 1969 by Carlos F. Martinez Guerrero and several of his associates. Operations commenced in July 1970, however, the first aircraft, a Canadair CL-44 freighter did not commence service with the airline until 1971. Flights with the CL-44 commenced between Buenos Aires and Houston, on which cattle were transported, and the airline quickly established itself operating worldwide ad hoc charters, leading to the addition of three more of the aircraft type. The airline had regular flights to Houston, Miami, and Basel, Switzerland from September 1976.

The airline acquired its first Boeing 707 freighter from Dan-Air in 1978, and a second one a year later. The arrival of the 707s led to the gradual retirement from service of the CL-44s.

Transporte Aéreo Rioplatense continued to operate into the 1980s, but had ceased operations by 1989.

1981 CL-44 crash

In 1981 the airline was contracted to conduct a series of flights to send arms to Iran, to assist in arming Nicaraguan contras. Military equipment from Israel was shipped to Iran, in support of the latter during its war with Iraq. A total of 360 tons of arms was to be transported from Israel to Iran.

On 18 July 1981, one of the airline's CL-44s was returning to Cyprus after making the third delivery flight to Iran. It strayed into Soviet airspace in the Azerbaijan Soviet Socialist Republic and the Soviet Air Force sent a Sukhoi Su-15 to intercept it. The Su-15 hit the CL-44's tail and it crashed near the Soviet–Turkish border, killing all four of the occupants. The Soviet Union claimed that its Su-15 pilot deliberately downed the CL-44 by aerial ramming.

Fleet 
 Boeing 707-320C (2)
 Canadair CL-44-6 (2)
 Canadair CL-44-D4 (2)

References

Defunct airlines of Argentina
Airlines established in 1969
Airlines disestablished in 1989
Defunct cargo airlines
Military of Argentina
Iran–Contra affair
Arms trafficking
Aviation accidents and incidents in 1981
Argentine companies established in 1969